George Watson Hogg Gibson (1827 – 5 September 1910) was an Australian cricketer. He played nine first-class cricket matches for Victoria between 1865 and 1873.

Gibson's highest first-class score was 41, the highest score for either side, when Victoria beat New South Wales by an innings in April 1872. In the next contest between the two teams 11 months later, at the age of 45 Gibson captained Victoria and again top-scored in the match, this time with 32 and 15 not out, in a 24-run victory to Victoria.

Gibson had a chemist's shop in the Melbourne suburb of Carlton.

See also
 List of Victoria first-class cricketers

References

1827 births
1910 deaths
Australian cricketers
Victoria cricketers
Melbourne Cricket Club cricketers
Emigrants from British Jamaica